Mahadeva Iyer Ganapati (known as M. Ganapati) (1903–1976) was an Indian engineer who was well known for his accomplishments in national projects. The Rourkela Steel Plant in Orissa, and many Railway projects including Churchgate railway station in Mumbai and Chittaranjan Locomotive Works (CLW) were completed under his leadership. The Indian government awarded him the inaugural Padma Bhushan in 1954. He was the president of the Institution of Engineers (India) for 1973-74.

The main projects with which he was associated with are:
 Rourkela Steel Plant
 Kandla Port
 Malaviya Bridge at Varanasi
 Chittaranjan Loco Works
 Perambur Integral Coach factory
 Vivekananda Setu, Kolkata (as Deputy)
 Churchgate Railway Station and other Western Railway projects

Awards and honours 

 Railway Board Gold Medal, 1950
 Viceroy's Prize from Institution of Engineers India, 1953
 Padma Bhushan

References

1903 births
1976 deaths
Indian civil engineers
Recipients of the Padma Bhushan in civil service
20th-century Indian engineers